The New Town Gardens are a collection of around 30 mostly private gardens and parks within the Edinburgh New Town Conservation Area spread across the New Town and north of the West End, listed as a heritage designation since March 2001. The gardens comprise a series of 18th and 19th century town gardens, squares and walks, established contemporaneously with the New Town of Edinburgh between 1767 and around 1850.

History

Most of the gardens were established contemporaneously to the New Town, and north West End of Edinburgh.

Some have unique history such as the Hopetoun Crescent Gardens, which were the original site of the Royal Botanic Garden Edinburgh. The Queen Street Central gardens have a pond with an island, said to have inspired Robert Louis Stevenson's Treasure Island.

Membership and access
Each garden has different rules concerning criteria for membership and access, with some permitting only those owning or renting surrounding properties a key, while others welcome applications from residents in other parts of the City of Edinburgh. Some gardens are regularly opened to the public, such as St Andrew Square, while others are only opened to the public on Doors Open Days or not at all.

Ownership and management
Each garden has a different management and ownership structure. Ownership is often by private shareholders or a joint ownership by the local residents. For example, East Queen Street Gardens are owned by shareholders who have explicitly bought a share in the land, and keys are rented to those who apply successfully for access, as a way of bringing in income to the garden. The gardens are then usually managed by Commissioners – around eight for each garden. The Commissioners are elected by the owners, and have responsibility for sourcing gardeners, and ensuring the gardens are well maintained. A Clerk of the gardens usually handles membership applications and entitlement. The Clerk will be a member of a local solicitors firm, with their contact details often on plaques on the gates to the gardens.

Some of the gardens, such as Bellvue Crescent Gardens and Gayfield Square Gardens, are now owned and managed by City of Edinburgh Council.

List of gardens

Bellevue Crescent Gardens
Charlotte Square Gardens
Claremont Crescent Gardens
Dean Gardens
Douglas Crescent Gardens
Drummond Place Garden
Drumsheugh Gardens
East Circus Place Garden
Eglinton Crescent and Glencairn Crescent Gardens
Gayfield Square Gardens
Grosvenor Crescent and Lansdowne Crescent Gardens
Hillside Crescent Gardens
Hopetoun Crescent Gardens
India Street Gardens
Learmonth Gardens
London Road Gardens
Moray Feu Gardens
Queen Street Central Gardens
Queen Street Gardens East
Queen Street Gardens West
Randolph Crescent Garden
Regent, Royal and Carlton Terrace Gardens
Rothesay Terrace Gardens
Royal Circus Gardens
Rutland Square Garden
Saxe-Coburg Place Gardens
St Andrew Square Gardens
St. Bernard's Crescent Garden

References

Gardens in Edinburgh
New Town, Edinburgh